Krieger (German, 'warrior') may refer to:

People
 Krieger (surname), including a list of people with that surname

Geography
 Krieger (crater), a lunar crater
 Krieger Mountains, in northern Ellesmere Island, Nunavut, Canada
 Kriegers Flak,  a reef in the Baltic Sea

Other uses
 "Krieger" (song), a 2003 song by And One
 Kriéger Company of Electric Vehicles
 Krieger-Nelson Prize a Canadian Mathematical Society award to outstanding women in mathematics

See also
 .kkrieger, a first-person shooter
 Maschinen Krieger ZbV 3000, a science fiction universe created by Kow Yokoyama
 Kreiger (surname)
 Kruger (and Krüger), a surname